William Wallace Kingsbury (June 4, 1828 – April 17, 1892) was a Delegate from the Territory of Minnesota.

Education
Born in Towanda, Pennsylvania, he attended the academies at Towanda, and Athens, Pennsylvania. He clerked in a store, became a surveyor, and later moved to Endion, Minnesota (now Duluth) in 1852.

Political life
He became a member of the Minnesota Territorial House of Representatives in 1857 and a delegate to the Minnesota State Constitutional Convention in 1857. Kingsbury was elected as a Democrat to the 35th congress and served from March 4, 1857, to May 11, 1858, when a portion of the Territory was admitted as a State into the Union. He was not a candidate for renomination in 1858 and later returned to Towanda in 1865 and engaged in the real estate and insurance business.

Kingsbury was engaged as a commission merchant in Baltimore, Maryland for three years, after which he moved to Tarpon Springs, Florida in 1887. He was involved in real estate and mercantile pursuits until his death there and was interred in Cycadia Cemetery.

Legacy
Kingsbury Creek, in St. Louis County, Minnesota, was named after Kingsbury.

References

External links

1828 births
1892 deaths
19th-century American businesspeople
19th-century American politicians
American real estate businesspeople
Delegates to the United States House of Representatives from Minnesota Territory
Members of the Minnesota Territorial Legislature
Minnesota Democrats
People from Tarpon Springs, Florida
People from Towanda, Pennsylvania
Politicians from Baltimore
Politicians from Duluth, Minnesota